Queenston is a compact rural community and unincorporated place  north of Niagara Falls in the Town of Niagara-on-the-Lake, Ontario, Canada. It is bordered by Highway 405 to the south and the Niagara River to the east; its location at the eponymous Queenston Heights on the Niagara Escarpment led to the establishment of the Queenston Quarry in the area. Across the river and the Canada–US border is the village of Lewiston, New York. The Lewiston-Queenston Bridge links the two communities.
This village is at the point where the Niagara River began eroding the Niagara Escarpment.

In the early 19th century, the community's name was spelled as Queenstown.

Queenston marks the southern terminus of the Bruce Trail. The cairn marking the trail's terminus is in a parking lot, about 160 metres (520 ft) from General Brock's Monument on the easterly side of the monument's park grounds.

History

Queenston was first settled in the 1770s by Loyalist refugees and immigrants from the United States. By 1807, the village had 100 homes and a population of 300.

A new portage around Niagara Falls was developed in the 1780s with Queenston at its north end. Wharves, storehouses and a block-house were built. Initially called Lower Landing, it was named Queenston by Lieut.-Governor Simcoe. A great deal of fighting occurred here during the War of 1812, in the settlement and at nearby Fort George. In that era, Laura Secord lived in this area. Rebel William Lyon Mackenzie lived in Queenston in the 1820s and operated his publishing operation here.

On 13 October 1812, American troops took possession of Queenston Heights. Major-General Sir Isaac Brock arrived from Fort George, Ontario with a small force and was killed while trying to regain the heights. The British, Mohawk and militia troops under Major-General Roger Hale Sheaffe, with reinforcements from Chippawa, Ontario were able to take the hill and captured nearly 1000 prisoners.  The victory and Brock's death are commemorated by Brock's Monument atop the Niagara Escarpment with a large stone statue of Brock overlooking the village below. Nearby is a smaller monument to Brock's gray horse, Alfred, which may, or may not, have been at Queenston during the battle. Queenston Heights is one of the National Historic Sites of Canada, so recognized in June 1968.

The settlement of Queenston was destroyed on 10 December 1813. British Captain William Hamilton Merritt later said that he saw "nothing but heaps of coals, and the streets full of furniture".

In the 1830s, Queenston was  terminus for a first horse-drawn railway, the Erie and Ontario. The subsequent steam railroad that started in around 1854 bypassed Queenston.

In nearby St. David's, the Queenston Quarry was founded in 1837, and for 150 years stone was shipped here to help build many of Ontario's cities. Toronto buildings that benefitted from the supply of stone included Queen's Park, the Royal Ontario Museum, Union Station and the Gibraltar Point Lighthouse.

By the mid-1800s, the Welland Canal became the primary method of shipping goods and the village of Queenston received little trade.

Queenston became part of the town of Niagara-on-the-Lake in 1970.

RiverBrink Art Museum is located in Queenston. It is home to a unique collection of over 1,400 artworks and artefacts by Canadian and international artists, assembled by Samuel E. Weir. Completed in 1970, the building features Georgian-style architecture, including a mansard roof and gabled windows. It served as Weir's country residence, and was converted into an art museum following his death in 1981.

See also
 Laura Secord Legacy Trail

Gallery

References

Other map sources

External links

 Location of Queenston with photos and links to web sites related to the area
Images of Queenston Niagara Falls Public Library (Ont.)
Images of Queenston Dock Niagara Falls Public Library (Ont.)
Images of Queenston Heights Niagara Falls Public Library (Ont.)

Neighbourhoods in Niagara-on-the-Lake
Quarries in Canada
Surface mines in Canada
Populated places established in the 1770s